Hugo Pineda (born 10 May 1962) is a Mexican former footballer. He played in 16 matches for the Mexico national football team from 1987 to 1997. He was also part of Mexico's squad for the 1997 Copa América tournament.

References

External links
 

1962 births
Living people
Mexican footballers
Mexico international footballers
Association football goalkeepers
Atlético Morelia players
Tampico Madero F.C. footballers
Leones Negros UdeG footballers
Correcaminos UAT footballers
Atlante F.C. footballers
Atlético Celaya footballers
Club América footballers
Club Necaxa footballers
San Luis F.C. players
Liga MX players
Footballers from Tamaulipas
Sportspeople from Tampico, Tamaulipas